Akmuo is a village in , Varėna district municipality, in Alytus County, in southeastern Lithuania. According to the 2001 and 2011 census, the village has a population of 0.

References

Villages in Varėna District Municipality